Wilson Lee Flores is a Philippine writer, real-estate entrepreneur, and economic and geopolitical analyst from the Ilocos.

He has won 15 Catholic Mass Media Awards (CMMA) for his Philippine Star newspaper columns and three Don Carlos Palanca Memorial Awards for Literature. He has also been honored with three CMMA Hall of Fame Awards, including CMMA Hall of Fame Awards for "Best Opinion Column" and "Best Business Column". He writes a Tagalog column "Kuwentong Panadero" for Philippine Star Group's mass-market Pilipino Star Ngayon tabloid.

In December 2013, he bought the Kamuning Bakery-Café of Quezon City. He is moderator of the café's non-partisan and tertulia-inspired "Pandesal Forum", where leaders dialog with media. Since 2015, Flores has led the Kamuning Bakery-Café in celebrating "World Pandesal Day" every October 16 (globally known as "World Bread Day" and "World Food Day"). "World Pandesal Day" is celebrated in order to honor the Philippines' most popular bread  and as a reminder of the need to solve the age-old problem of hunger.

References

Year of birth missing (living people)
Living people
Ilocano people
Filipino people of Chinese descent
Filipino columnists
Filipino activists
Geopoliticians
21st-century Filipino businesspeople